Kelly Road Park is a public, urban park in Apex, North Carolina. Located at 1609 Kelly Road, it is on the west side of Apex near Olive Chapel Elementary School.

The 25 acre park is dominated by a large wooden playground structure. It is split into two separate sections, one for younger children (2-5) and the other for older children (5-12).

The park also contains a picnic shelter, grill, baseball field, and tennis courts.

Kelly Road Park is a trailhead for the Beaver Creek Greenway.

References

Apex, North Carolina
Urban public parks
Parks in Wake County, North Carolina
Tourist attractions in Apex, North Carolina